Pedro Ballester Pascual San Martin (born October 23, 1924) is a Cuban former shortstop in the Negro leagues.

A native of Cárdenas, Cuba, Ballester played for the New York Cubans in 1948. He went on to play minor league baseball through the mid-1950s with such clubs as the Keokuk Kernels, Fond du Lac Panthers, and Sherbrooke Athletics.

References

External links
 and Seamheads

1924 births
Possibly living people
New York Cubans players
Baseball shortstops
Cuban baseball players
People from Cárdenas, Cuba
Cuban expatriates in the United States